Hi Air Co., Ltd (하이에어), operating as Hi Air, is a regional airline in South Korea that was founded in 2017 and began operations in December 2019. The airline's first route started was between Ulsan and Seoul. In June 2020 it purchased two ATR 72-500 aircraft from ATR in order to expand its network with five new routes, despite the global slump in air travel caused by the COVID-19 pandemic.

Destinations

Fleet
, the Hi Air fleet consists of the following aircraft:

See also
 Transport in South Korea
 List of companies of South Korea
 List of airlines of South Korea

References

External links
 Hi Airlines 

Airlines of South Korea
Airlines established in 2017
South Korean companies established in 2017